The 2017 LSU Tigers football team represented Louisiana State University in the 2017 NCAA Division I FBS football season. The Tigers played their home games at Tiger Stadium in Baton Rouge, Louisiana and competed in the Western Division of the Southeastern Conference (SEC). They were led by first-year head coach Ed Orgeron after he led the Tigers as interim head coach for the final eight games of 2016. They finished the season 9–4, 6–2 in SEC play to finish in third place in the Western Division. They were invited to the Citrus Bowl where they lost to Notre Dame.

The Tigers equaled an FBS record by committing only eight turnovers during the season, becoming the sixth FBS team to do so. The record would fall the next season to Georgia Southern, which had only five turnovers.

Recruiting

Position key

Recruits

The Tigers signed a total of 23 recruits.

Roster

Schedule
LSU announced its 2017 football schedule on September 13, 2016. The 2017 schedule consisted of 6 home, 5 away and 1 neutral site game in the regular season. The Tigers hosted SEC foes Arkansas, Auburn, and Texas A&M, and traveled to Alabama, Florida, Mississippi State, Ole Miss, and Tennessee.

The Tigers hosted three of the four non-conference opponents, Chattanooga from the FCS Southern Conference, Syracuse from the Atlantic Coast Conference and Troy from the Sun Belt Conference and traveled to New Orleans to for a neutral site matchup against independent BYU.

Schedule Source:
 The game between LSU and BYU was originally scheduled to take place at NRG Stadium in Houston, Texas.  However, due to massive flooding caused by Hurricane Harvey in the Houston area, school and game officials decided to relocate the game to New Orleans.

Rankings

References

LSU
LSU Tigers football seasons
LSU Tigers football